Dalmatianism, Dalmatianness or Dalmatian nationalism refers to the historical nationalism or patriotism of Dalmatians and Dalmatian culture. There were significant Dalmatian nationalists in the 19th century, but Dalmatian regional nationalism faded in significance over time in favor of ethnic nationalism.

17th century Dalmatian poet Jerolim Kavanjin (Girolamo Cavagnini) exhibited Dalmatianism, identifying himself as "Dalmatian" and calling Dalmatia his homeland, which John Fine interprets not to have been a nationalist notion.

During Dalmatia's incorporation in Austrian Empire, with the Autonomist Party in Dalmatia refusing and opposed plans to incorporate Dalmatia into Croatia; instead it supported an autonomous Dalmatia based on a multicultural association of Dalmatia's ethnic communities: Croats, Serbs, and Italians, united as Dalmatians. The Autonomist Party has been accused of secretly having been a pro-Italian movement due to their defense of the rights of ethnic Italians in Dalmatia. Also support for the autonomy of Dalmatia, had deep historic roots in identifying Dalmatian culture as linking Western culture via Venetian Italian influence and Eastern culture via South Slavic influence, such a view was supported by Dalmatian autonomist Stipan Ivičević. The Autonomist Party did not claim to be an Italian movement, and indicated that it sympathized with a sense of heterogeneity amongst Dalmatians in opposition to ethnic nationalism. In the 1861 elections, the Autonomists won twenty-seven seats in Dalmatia, while Dalmatia's Croatian nationalist movement, the People's Party, won only fourteen seats.

The issue of autonomy of Dalmatia was debated after the creation of Yugoslavia in 1918, due to divisions within Dalmatia over proposals of merging the region with the territories composing the former Kingdom of Croatia-Slavonia. Proposals for the autonomy of Dalmatia within Yugoslavia were made by Dalmatians within the Yugoslav Partisans during World War II; however, these proposals were strongly opposed by Croatian Communists and the proposals were soon abandoned.

Dalmatian National Party

Dalmatian National Party was a political organisation in Croatia (despite its name, it was not registered as political party) which promoted revival of Dalmatian language and creation of autonomous region of Dalmatia in  Dalmatia and Quarnaro islands region.

See also 
 Istrianism
 Autonomist Party (Dalmatia)
 Croatian nationalism
 Dalmatia
 Dalmatian Action (DA) and Dalmatian National Party (DNP), political parties that supported the autonomy of Dalmatia within Croatia in the 1990s.

References

Dalmatia
History of Dalmatia
Politics of Austria-Hungary
Politics of Italy
Politics of Croatia